Damazin Airport  is an airport serving Damazin, located in the Blue Nile state in Sudan.

Facilities

Airlines and destinations

Damazin Air Base

The airport hosts Sudanese Air Force Helicopter Squadron operating transport helicopters and attack helicopters:

 Mil Mi-8
 Mil Mi-24
 Mil Mi-35

References

 Google Maps - Damazin

External links
 

Airports in Sudan
Blue Nile (state)